Villers-Outréaux is a commune in the Nord department in northern France.

Heraldry

History 
A German airbase was in the town in WW-I.

War Memorial

In September 2018 the villagers of Villers-Outréaux dedicated an especially commissioned memorial to commemorate British soldier Jack Williams (VC), (Victoria Cross), to express their thanks for helping to save their village from certain destruction, in 1918

See also
Communes of the Nord department

References

Villersoutreaux